Bernard "Benny" Casofsky (1919–1987), was a former male English international table tennis player.

He was part of the England team that competed at the 1947 World Table Tennis Championships in the Swaythling Cup (men's team event) with Ernest Bubley, Eric Filby, George 'Eli' Goodman and Johnny Leach.

He was of Jewish descent and was part of the Manchester team along with Leslie Cohen and Hyman Lurie that won the Wilmott Cup (National Team Championship) on three occasions. He was also ranked Manchester number one.

He was later the president of the Manchester and District League.

See also
 List of England players at the World Team Table Tennis Championships
 List of World Table Tennis Championships medalists

References

English male table tennis players
1919 births
1987 deaths